Égerszög is a village in Borsod-Abaúj-Zemplén County in northeastern Hungary. As of 2008 it had a population of 53.

References

Populated places in Borsod-Abaúj-Zemplén County